The 1998–99 Slovak First Football League (known as the Mars superliga for sponsorship reasons) was the sixth season of first-tier football league in Slovakia, since its establishment in 1993. This season started on 1 August 1998 and ended on 29 May 1999. 1. FC Košice are the defending champions.

Teams
A total of 16 teams was contested in the league, including 14 sides from the 1997–98 season and two promoted from the 2. Liga.

Lokomotíva Košice and FK DAC 1904 Dunajská Streda was relegated to the 1998–99 2. Liga. The two relegated teams were replaced by FC Nitra and ZTS Kerametal Dubnica.

Stadiums and locations

League table

Results

Season statistics

Top scorers

See also
1998–99 Slovak Cup
1998–99 2. Liga (Slovakia)

References

External links
RSSSF.org (Tables and statistics)

Slovak Super Liga seasons
Slovak
1